Heishma Northern  is a former head coach of Prairie View A&M Panthers football team. He was named the head coach in December 2010 and served until November 2014.

Head coaching record

References

External links
 Prairie View A&M profile

Year of birth missing (living people)
Living people
Grambling State Tigers football coaches
Morehouse Maroon Tigers football coaches
Prairie View A&M Panthers football coaches
High school football coaches in Louisiana
African-American coaches of American football
20th-century African-American sportspeople
21st-century African-American sportspeople